Annamária Kinde (10 June 1956 – 5 January 2014) was a Romanian journalist, poet and editor.

Annamária Kinde was an ethnic Hungarian and died on 5 January 2014, aged 57. She was survived by her daughter, Anna (born 1990).

References

1956 births
2014 deaths
People from Oradea
Romanian people of Hungarian descent
Romanian journalists
Romanian women poets
Romanian editors
Romanian women editors
Romanian women journalists
20th-century Romanian poets
20th-century Romanian women writers